The Government College is an arts and science college located on a hill called Manimalakunnu, near Koothattukulam in the Ernakulam district of Kerala, India.

It was established in 1981 with the initiative of local peasants and village leaders who formed a Rural Education Society and raised money through donations. Later the land was handed over to the government of Kerala to establish a junior college. The college is accredited with the National Assessment and Accreditation Council at B Grade.

The institution provides educational opportunity to the students of the rural areas especially those from the neighbouring villages  of Thirumarady, Mannathoor,Elanji Koothattukulam, Palakuzha, Pampakuda, Piravom, Mulanthuruthy and Ramamangalam, all remote villages with no other facility for higher learning. Students from the suburbs of Ernakulam and Muvattupuzha constitutes a significant proportion. In recent years, students from distant districts like Kannur, Kozhikkode, Malappuram, Thrissur and Palakkad are enrolling in sizable number because of the availability of hostel facilities and because of the launch of new courses like BA English, BA Malayalam and the new generation course of MA Econometrics.

The college is affiliated with the Mahatma Gandhi University. The college offers EDUSAT facilities for e-learning and teaching.

History
The history of T.M Jacob Memorial Government College, Manimalakunnu is the story of the initiatives of the Rural Education Society (RES- NO.ER-332/76), a charitable trust founded by the agrarian people in the Thirumaradi panchayat for satisfying their thirst for higher education. The year 1981 witnessed the starting of a  government college at Manimalakunnu, a result of the work of the Late Sri. K.C. Zacharia, Ex. MLA (President), Sri. M. J. Jacob Muttappallil (Secretary), and Sri. Thomas Mathai Pallippattu (treasurer), the then office bearers. Originally affiliated to the University of Kerala, the college is now affiliated to the MGU, Kottayam.

The college was formally inaugurated by late Sri, Baby John, Minister for education, on  29 September 1981 at a public function presided over by Sri. P.C Chacko, the then local MLA and Hon’ble Minister for Industries, Government of Kerala. Classes were temporarily started in the Parish Hall of St. John's Catholic Church, Vadakara. On 1 June 1983, the college was shifted to the newly constructed building at Manimalakunnu. On 13 March 1984, the required extent of land along with the building was officially handed over to the Government on behalf of the society by Sri. T.M Jacob, Minister for Education in a ceremony, presided over by the local MLA, Sri. Benny Bahanan.

Within a very short span of time, the college became a centre for higher learning catering to the needs of the poor and backward students; most of them belonging to SC, ST and minority categories in the eastern part of Ernakulam District.

The college offers three postgraduate and six undergraduate programmes. The two language courses - BA English and BA Malayalam provides course specific skills to the students in the form of OJT and lab sessions. The MA Econometrics course has practical (lab) and an internship programme as part of their course curriculum. The college has the distinction of being one of the few state owned arts and science colleges in central Kerala using ICT techniques for augmenting teaching-learning processes.

Milestones

 1981- college started functioning in the Parish Hall, St. John The Baptist Catholic Church, Vadakara.
 1983  - Shifted to the present campus
 1984 -  Upgraded as an undergraduate college by starting B.Com.
 1991 - UG Course BA Economics starts.
 1993 - UG Course of BSc Physics starts.
 1994 -  UGC granted  affiliation and listed u/s2/f) and 12 (b)
 2004 - MSc Pharmaceutical Chemistry starts. 
 1998-  MCom starts.
 2008 – NAAC accredited with B grade.
 2012 - BA English and BA Malayalam starts. 
 2018 - NAAC reaccreditation with B grade. 
 2020 - MA Econometrics starts.

Courses

Graduate programmes

	B.Com. (Cooperation)
	B.A.Economics	
	B.Sc.Physics
	B.Sc.Chemistry(Model-II Industrial Chemistry)
	BA English-Triple Main (Literature, Communication and Journalism)	
	BA Malayalam(Model-II Journalism  and copy writing)

Postgraduate programmes

	M.Sc.Pharmaceutical Chemistry
	M.Com.
   M A Econometrics

References

External links
 Kerala Colleges website: Govt. College, Manimalakunnu

  http://tmjmgcm.ac.in/

Arts and Science colleges in Kerala
Colleges affiliated to Mahatma Gandhi University, Kerala
Universities and colleges in Ernakulam district
Educational institutions established in 1981
1981 establishments in Kerala